Agnorisma badinodis (pale-banded dart or spotted-sided cutworm) is a moth of the family Noctuidae. It is found in southern Canada and United States, east of the 100th meridian, and exclusive of the Deep South.

The wingspan is about 36 mm. There is one generation per year.

Recorded food plants include Stellaria media, Sisymbrium officinale, Trifolium, Medicago sativa, Rumex, Symphyotrichum ericoides and Triticum aestivum.

External links
Moths of North Dakota
Images

Noctuinae
Moths of North America
Moths described in 1874